The 1998 Macau Grand Prix Formula Three was the 45th Macau Grand Prix race to be held on the streets of Macau on 22 November 1998. It was the fifteenth edition for Formula Three cars. Peter Dumbreck of the TOM'S team won the two-leg aggregate 30-lap race by three-thousands of a second (about ) over Paul Stewart Racing driver Ricardo Maurício, the closest margin of victory in the history of the Macau Grand Prix and one of the closest in motor racing history.

Entry list

Race Results

References

External links
 The official website of the Macau Grand Prix

Macau Grand Prix
Grand
Macau